Ryan Bethea (born March 26, 1967) is a former American football wide receiver who played two seasons with the Charlotte Rage of the Arena Football League. He was drafted by the Minnesota Vikings in the fifth round of the 1988 NFL Supplemental Draft. He played college football at the University of South Carolina.

Professional career
Bethea was selected by the Minnesota Vikings in the fifth round of the 1988 NFL Supplemental Draft. He entered the supplemental draft due to being suspended indefinitely from the South Carolina Gamecocks football team over drug-related charges.

Charlotte Rage
Bethea played for the Charlotte Rage from 1992 to 1993, recording 118 receptions and 24 touchdowns on 1,330 receiving yards. He earned AFL All-Star honors in 1993.

Coaching career

Bergen Storm
Bethea was head coach of the Bergen Storm from 2009 to 2010.

References

External links
Just Sports Stats
College stats

Living people
1967 births
Players of American football from Columbia, South Carolina
American football wide receivers
African-American players of American football
South Carolina Gamecocks football players
Charlotte Rage players
21st-century African-American people
20th-century African-American sportspeople